Tamarac may refer to:

Settlements
 Tamarac, Florida
 Tamarac Township, Minnesota

Wild areas in Minnesota
 Tamarac National Wildlife Refuge
 Tamarac Wilderness, within the Refuge

Rivers in Minnesota
 Tamarac River (Red River of the North)
 Tamarac River (Red Lake)
 Little Tamarac River

Rivers of Quebec
Tamarac River (Gatineau River tributary), a tributary of Pain de Sucre Lake, in Quebec, in Canada

See also
 Tamarack (disambiguation)